In molecular biology mir-598 microRNA is a short RNA molecule. MicroRNAs function to regulate the expression levels of other genes by several mechanisms.

miR-598 in senescence
miR-598 has been shown to directly target and inhibit the Sir2 homolog, silent information regulator one (SRT1) enzyme, in the senescence of human adipose-tissue-derived mesenchymal stem cells. Increased miR-598 expression during the senescent state is accompanied by a decreased expression of SRT1, meaning an absence of the inhibited p53 acetylation usually observed with increased STR1 levels. miR-598 acts to modulate cellular senescence. More specifically, its overexpression induces senescence in early-passage cells whilst inhibition conversely sees a partial recovery of the ageing phenotype through increased cellular differentiation.

See also 
 MicroRNA

References

Further reading

External links
 

Senescence
MicroRNA
MicroRNA precursor families